Matteo Priuli may refer to:

Matteo Priuli (bishop), 16th century Italian Roman Catholic bishop 
Matteo Priuli (cardinal) (1577–1624), Italian Roman Catholic cardinal